There were four bowling events at the 2018 South American Games in Cochabamba, Bolivia. The events were held between May 26 and 30 at the Rock'n Bowl in the capital of La Paz. The top 4 teams in each gender (determined by total pins knocked down in the singles and doubles combined) qualified to compete at the 2019 Pan American Games in Lima, Peru. Each country had too choose two events to qualify through. Uruguay was the only nation to select this event to qualify through.

Medal summary

Medal table

Medalists

References

Bowling
South American Games
Qualification tournaments for the 2019 Pan American Games
2018